Lightfish refers to two groups of bioluminescent fishes:

 Family Phosichthyidae.
 Bristlemouths in the family Gonostomatidae.